2nd Front may refer to major formations of the Soviet Army during World War II:
 2nd Baltic Front
 2nd Belorussian Front
 2nd Far Eastern Front
 2nd Ukrainian Front